Proprioseiopsis bay is a species of mite in the family Phytoseiidae.

References

bay
Articles created by Qbugbot
Animals described in 1980